The following ships of the Royal Thai Navy have been named Bangpakong:

 , a Type 053 frigate built in the People's Republic of China

Royal Thai Navy ship names